Palfreyman is a surname, and may refer to:

 Brent Palfreyman (born 1945), Australian former first-class cricketer
 David Palfreyman (born 1966), English actor, musician, songwriter and poet
 George Palfreyman, American college football coach, 1816–1918
 Joey Palfreyman (born 1974), English darts player
 Nigel Palfreyman (born 1973), Australian rules footballer
 Stewart Palfreyman (born 1948), former Australian rules footballer
 Thomas Palfreyman (died c. 1589), English author and musician